Authadistis is a genus of moths of the family Noctuidae.

Species
Authadistis camptogramma Hampson, 1916
Authadistis metaleuca Hampson, 1902
Authadistis nyctichroa Hampson, 1926

References
Natural History Museum Lepidoptera genus database

Catocalinae